The Legislative Assembly of the Republic of Karelia is the regional parliament of Karelia, a federal subject of Russia. It consists of 36 deputies who are elected for five-year terms.

Between 1994 and 2002, it was divided into two chambers: the Chamber of Representatives and the Chamber of the Republic.

Elections

2011

2016

2021

See also
List of chairmen of the Legislative Assembly of the Republic of Karelia

Notes

References

External links
Official website of the Legislative Assembly of the Republic of Karelia 

Politics of the Republic of Karelia
Karelia
Karelia
Karelia